The Big East women's basketball tournament is a conference championship tournament in women's basketball. It was first held in 1983, at the end of the 1982–83 college basketball season that was the first in which the Big East Conference sponsored women's basketball. Following the 2013 split of the original Big East along football lines, the women's basketball history of the original conference has been maintained by the non-football league that assumed the Big East name. The tournament determines the conference's champion, which receives an automatic bid to the NCAA tournament.

From 2004 through 2013, the tournament was held in the Veterans Memorial Coliseum at the XL Center (formerly known as the Hartford Civic Center). The first three tournaments after the relaunch of the Big East in 2013 were hosted by DePaul University. In 2014, opening-round games were played at McGrath–Phillips Arena on the school's Chicago campus and all other games played at Allstate Arena in suburban Rosemont. All games in the 2015 tournament were held at Allstate Arena, and all 2016 tournament games were held at McGrath–Phillips Arena. The 2017 tournament was the first since the relaunch to be held outside the Chicago area, with all games being played at Al McGuire Center on the Marquette University campus in Milwaukee. From 2018–2020, the tournament was held at Wintrust Arena at the McCormick Place convention center on Chicago’s Near South Side.

Starting in 2009, the tournament expanded to include all 16 of the conference's teams at that time. The teams finishing 9 through 16 in the regular season standings played first round games, while teams 5 through 8 receive a bye to the second round. The top 4 teams during the regular season receive a double-bye to the quarterfinals. The 2013 tournament, the final one under the original Big East structure, saw 15 teams participate, following West Virginia's 2012 move to the Big 12 Conference. The tournament now features all 11 members of the reconfigured conference.

In June 2020, it was reported that the tournament will return to Connecticut at the Mohegan Sun Arena moving forward with the return of UConn.

History of the tournament finals

Notes

Performance by school

Most Outstanding Player

References